XLB may refer to:
Lac Brochet Airport (IATA code)
Xiaolongbao
XLB (Portland, Oregon), pair of Chinese restaurants in Portland, Oregon